Pallacanestro Femminile Schio, also known as Beretta Famila Schio for sponsorship reasons, is an Italian women's basketball team based in Schio that competes in Serie A.

Founded in 1973, Schio enjoyed its first successes between 1996 and 2002, winning two national cups and the two last editions of the Ronchetti Cup in 2001 and 2002. In 2005 the team won its first national championship, which they successfully defended the following year, to attain its first double. In 2008 Schio won the EuroCup Women in addition to the national championship, and in 2011 it won its second national double. Schio has played in the EuroLeague Women since the mid-2000s, reaching the 2012 edition's Final Eight after beating defending champion Perfumerías Avenida.

The team's president since 1987 is Marcello Cestaro, owner of the supermarket chain Famila. The team is co-sponsored by sausage brand Fratelli Beretta.

Honours

Domestic
 Serie A
 Winners (11): 2004–05, 2005–06, 2007–08, 2010–11, 2012–13, 2013–14, 2014–15, 2015–16, 2017–18, 2018–19, 2021–22

 Coppa Italia
 Winners (13): 1996, 1999, 2004, 2005, 2010, 2011, 2013, 2014, 2015, 2017, 2018, 2021, 2022

 Supercoppa Italiana
 Winners (13): 2005, 2006, 2011, 2012, 2013, 2014, 2015, 2016, 2017, 2018, 2019, 2021, 2022

International
 Ronchetti Cup
 Winners (2): 2000–01, 2001–02

 EuroCup Women
 Winners (1): 2007–08

References

External links
 Official website

Schio
EuroLeague Women clubs
EuroCup Women-winning clubs
Basketball teams established in 1973
Schio
1973 establishments in Italy